The House at 26 Francis Avenue in Wakefield, Massachusetts is a Colonial Revival octagon house.  The shingle-clad wood-frame house rests on a high fieldstone foundation, is 2 stories at its rear and 1-1/2 in front, and has the appearance of a square house with four square sections projecting diagonally from each of its corners.  The house has a Craftsman/Bungalow-style hip-roofed dormer with diamond-paned windows, and its main entrance is oriented diagonally toward the corner, under a porch supported by round columns.

The house was added to the National Register of Historic Places in 1989.

See also
List of octagon houses
National Register of Historic Places listings in Wakefield, Massachusetts
National Register of Historic Places listings in Middlesex County, Massachusetts

References

Houses on the National Register of Historic Places in Wakefield, Massachusetts
Houses in Wakefield, Massachusetts
Octagon houses in Massachusetts